Carlos Jesús Infante Figueroa (born 14 February 1982) is a Mexican former football defender.

Career 
Infante made his professional debut in a game against Club León on 25 February 2001. The game ended with América and León tying at 1. Though Infante was used regularly as a substitute, América loaned him out to UANL Tigres prior to the Clausura 2004 season. Appearing only in 2 games as a substitute that season, Infante was loaned out again, this time to CD Veracruz. After a brief spell there, Infante returned to Club América, where he remains until he was dealt to Necaxa for the Clausura 2009 season.

External links 
 
 
ESPN Carlos Infante

Living people
1982 births
Club América footballers
C.D. Veracruz footballers
Tigres UANL footballers
Association football defenders
Footballers from the State of Mexico
Mexican footballers